Attila Kriston (born 6 June 1975 in Budapest) is a former Hungarian professional football player who played for Livingston and Hungary among others.

References

External links
 

1975 births
Living people
Hungarian footballers
Association football midfielders
Hungary international footballers
BFC Siófok players
FC Sachsen Leipzig players
Ferencvárosi TC footballers
Livingston F.C. players
Fehérvár FC players
Zalaegerszegi TE players
Kaposvári Rákóczi FC players
MTK Budapest FC players
FC Tatabánya players
Paksi FC players
Scottish Premier League players
Hungarian expatriate footballers
Expatriate footballers in Germany
Expatriate footballers in Scotland
Expatriate footballers in Austria
Hungarian expatriate sportspeople in Germany
Hungarian expatriate sportspeople in Scotland
Hungarian expatriate sportspeople in Austria
Footballers from Budapest